Hero is the debut studio album by Australian pop singer John Paul Young. The album was released in October 1975 and peaked at 9 and stayed in the charts for 20 weeks.

The album was certified gold in Australia.

Track listing

Charts

Certifications

Personnel 
John Paul Young – Lead vocals
Ian "Willie" Winter – guitar
Johnny Dick – drums, percussion
Warren Morgan – keyboards, backing vocals
Ronnie Peel – bass guitar, backing vocals
Ray Goodwin – guitar

References

1975 debut albums
Albums produced by Harry Vanda
Albums produced by George Young (rock musician)
John Paul Young albums
Albert Productions albums